This is a list of ultra prominent peaks (with topographic prominence greater than 1,500 metres) in the Malay Archipelago, a group of over 25,000 islands which includes Brunei, Singapore, East Malaysia, Indonesia, the Philippines and East Timor. However, this list excludes ultras in the Philippines which are listed separately.

Sumatra

Java

Lesser Sunda Islands

Borneo

Sulawesi

Maluku Islands

Papua

See also
 For a complete list of ultras located on the island of New Guinea, see List of Ultras of Oceania
 For the list of ultras located in the Philippines, see List of Ultras of the Philippines
 List of volcanoes in Indonesia

Sources
List
Map

Malay Archipelago
Landforms of Southeast Asia